A supplementary election for the electoral district of Narracan was held on 28 January 2023, following the death of a nominated candidate prior to the 2022 Victorian state election.

Background
On 21 November 2022, it was reported that the Nationals candidate for the district of Narracan, Shaun Gilchrist, died suddenly. Under electoral law, this means that the lower house election for Narracan was declared as "failed" by the Victorian Electoral Commission. A supplementary election was held for that seat at 28 January 2023. The upper house election for that district, (within the Eastern Victoria Region) was held as scheduled on 26 November.

Labor and the Nationals did not recontest the supplementary election. Animal Justice Party and Family First Victoria nominated new candidates for the supplementary election.

Results

References

External links
2023 elections in Australia
Victorian state by-elections
2020s in Victoria (Australia)